Soraya Peke-Mason  is a New Zealand politician and Member of Parliament in the House of Representatives for the Labour Party.

Early life and career
Peke-Mason was born in Tokoroa and grew up in Castlecliff. She attended Castlecliff Primary, Rutherford Intermediate, and Whanganui High School. She is self-employed and with a business background in the construction, tourism, forestry and honey industries. She lives in Rātana, and has tribal affiliations to Ngāti Apa, Ngāti Rangi, Ngāti Tūwharetoa, and Tainui. She has been a justice of the peace for over 30 years and has a Masters degree in business administration from Massey University.

Local government
From 2001 to 2007 Peke-Mason was a member of the Rātana Community Board. Her time on the community board was focused on access to clean water for the town, an ambition culminating in 2016 with the opening of a new water treatment plant in the area.

Peke-Mason was a member of the Rangitīkei District Council for 12 years. She became the council's first Māori woman councillor at the 2007 New Zealand local elections, being elected as councillor for the newly created Turakina ward. She represented Turakina around the council table for the ward's entire existence, with the ward being abolished ahead of the 2019 local elections, when she stood unsuccessfully for a spot on the Horizons Regional Council.

Member of Parliament 

In the  she stood as the Labour candidate in the electorate of Te Tai Hauāuru. She came second to Tariana Turia.

She was unopposed for the nomination after Heather Warren, Labour's candidate from 2017, withdrew. She was unsuccessful in the Rangitīkei seat, but entered Parliament off the Labour list when Trevor Mallard resigned. She was sworn in on 25 October 2022, when, for the first time in history, women held a majority of seats in Parliament.

References

1950s births
Living people
People from Tokoroa
People educated at Wanganui High School
New Zealand justices of the peace
Massey University alumni
Tainui people
Ngāti Apa people
Ngāti Rangi people
Ngāti Tūwharetoa people
New Zealand Māori women
Rātana MPs
Māori MPs
New Zealand Labour Party MPs
Members of the New Zealand House of Representatives
New Zealand list MPs
Unsuccessful candidates in the 2011 New Zealand general election
Unsuccessful candidates in the 2020 New Zealand general election